The Appin coal mine disaster was a coal mine disaster in New South Wales that killed fourteen people:                                    
Alexander Lawson,                                                                                                                                          Alwyn Brewin,                                                                                                                                            
Francis Garrity,                                                                                                                                           Garry Woods,                                                                                                                                            
Geoffrey Johnson,                                                                                                                                            Ian Giffard,                                                                                                                                               James Oldcorn,                                                                                                                                              John Stonham,                                                                                                                                             Jurgen Lauterbach,                                                                                                                                          Karl Staats,                                                                                                                                               Peter Peck,                                                                                                                                               Robert Rawcliffe,                                                                                                                                            Roy Rawlings, and
Roy Williams                                                                                                                                                 in 1979, where a group of 46 workers were working the 3-11 pm shift and eating in the crib room, approximately 600 metres underground.

Memorials

A new memorial sculpture was unveiled 24th July 2020, consisting of 14 steel arches each representing one of the miners who died, gently curve upwards and inwards to form a tunnel, reminiscent of a longwall mine tunnel. The arches were made from local BlueScope Steel and the sculpture's three hardwood seating areas were made by members of the Appin Men's Shed. The sculpture was commissioned South32 a year ago on the 40th anniversary from sculptor Paul Johnson and designer Gail Mason.

Causes

An explosion that was caused by sparks from a fan control box which ignited a buildup of flammable and poisonous methane gas ripped apart the busiest pit, late on the night of Tuesday, 24 July 1979, and caused a series of fires in the mine's damaged ventilation system. Just after 11 pm, a huge roar was heard, and one survivor reported that the men had very little warning. Engineer Jim Hoffman felt the blast one kilometre away.

Rescue operation and aftermath

The rescue team's members were very distressed by what they saw. Among the twisted metal and clouds of gas were the bodies of ten men sitting where they had been relaxing in the crib room, with another four bodies being found a few metres from the coal face. The miners had no time to escape the danger or save themselves.  Thirty-one survivors reached the surface, with some sustaining severe burns. The search for survivors lasted 16 hours.

81 miners working on the same seam of coal were killed under similar circumstances nearly 100 years earlier.

Findings

The New South Wales government ordered a judicial inquiry into the disaster that found both the state government and the mine's owners, Australian Iron and Steel Ltd., guilty of contributing to the explosion.

The men responsible for carrying out safety checks before the explosion had noted the gas build-up and the ventilation problem, but did not warn anyone of the potential danger. However, the explosion was confined to the K panel heading due to the fact that the area had been adequately Stone Dusted only months before the explosion. 

The deaths of the 14 men led to the imposition of stricter safety rules for all mines. It was recommended that automatic devices be installed in mines to give continuous reading of gases, that a special officer supervise ventilation, and that the number of mine inspectors be increased.

References
 

 
 

1979 in Australia
1979 mining disasters
Coal mining disasters in Australia
Disasters in New South Wales
Mines in New South Wales
1970s in New South Wales